The Men's Team Class 4–5 table tennis competition at the 2008 Summer Paralympics was held between 13 September and 16 September at the Peking University Gymnasium. Classes 6–10 were for athletes with a physical impairment who competed from a standing position; the lower the number, the greater the impact the impairment had on an athlete's ability to compete.

The competition was a straight knock-out format. Each tie was decided by the best of a potential five matches, two singles, a doubles (not necessarily the same players) and two reverse singles.

The event was won by the team representing .

Competition bracket

First round

Quarter-finals

Semi-finals

Finals

Gold medal match

Bronze medal match

Team Lists

References

Table tennis at the 2008 Summer Paralympics